The Katian is the second stage of the Upper Ordovician. It is preceded by the Sandbian and succeeded by the Hirnantian Stage. The Katian began  million years ago and lasted for about 7.8 million years until the beginning of the Hirnantian  million years ago.
During the Katian the climate cooled which started the Late Ordovician glaciation.

Naming 
The name Katian is derived from Katy Lake (Atoka County, Oklahoma, United States).

GSSP 
The GSSP of the Katian Stage is the Black Knob Ridge Section in southeastern Oklahoma (United States). It is an outcrop of the Womble Shale and the Bigfork Chert, the latter containing the lower boundary of the Katian. The lower boundary is defined as the first appearance datum of the graptolite species Diplacanthograptus caudatus. This horizon is 4.0 m above the base of the Bigfork Chert.

References 

 
.
Ordovician geochronology